Hypsopygia griveaudalis is a species of snout moth in the genus Hypsopygia. It was described by Patrice J.A. Leraut in 2006 and is known from Ivory Coast.

References

Moths described in 2006
Endemic fauna of Ivory Coast
Moths of Africa
Pyralini